These are the presidents of Sarah Lawrence College in Westchester, New York.

References

Sarah Lawrence College presidents
Presidents
Sarah Lawrence